The Legislature of La Rioja, also sometimes referred to as the Legislative Function (Función Legislativa), is the unicameral legislative body of La Rioja Province, in Argentina. It comprises 36 legislators, elected in each of the 18 departments of La Rioja. Half of the legislature is renewed every two years.

The Legislature was established by the first provincial constitution, adopted in 1855, and convened for the first time on 18 March 1856. According to the provincial constitution, the legislature must count with one member per 4,000 inhabitants. Out of the 18 departments, 12 elect a single legislator, and thus employ the first-past-the-post system. The remaining six departments employ proportional representation to elect its multiple legislators. The Capital Department counts with the largest number of representatives in the legislature, with 8.

The Legislature is presided by the vice governor, who is elected every four years alongside the governor. The current vice governor, elected in 2019, is Florencia López, of the Justicialist Party.

Seats per department

References

External links
 
Constitution of La Rioja Province 

1855 establishments in Argentina
Politics of Argentina
La Rioja Province, Argentina
La Rioja